"Poker Face" (Japanese: ポーカー・フェイス; stylized as "poker face") is the debut single by Japanese singer Ayumi Hamasaki for her album A Song for ××. It was released under Avex Trax on 8 April 1998. Hamasaki wrote the lyrics and Yasuhiko Hoshino composed the music. The song peaked at number 20 on the Japanese Singles Chart and was certified as Gold by the Recording Industry Association of Japan (RIAJ). The song was re-released in 2001.

Chart performance
"Poker Face" entered at #20 on the charts with 11,520 units sold in its opening week and charted for six weeks. The single sold a total of 43,140 copies. The single was certified Gold by the RIAJ.

Music video
The music video for "Poker Face" was directed by Takeishi Wataru. The video focuses on Hamasaki standing in front of a large tree filled with television monitors that show her in various locations. It also shows her playing with animals.

Promotion
The song was used as the opening theme of a Japanese TV show called "Count Down TV".

Track listing
 "Poker Face"
 "Friend"
 "Poker Face" (Instrumental)
 "Friend" (Instrumental)

Re-release 

This single was re-released on February 28, 2001, featuring four new songs. The song re-entered the Japanese Singles Chart and peaked at number 31.

Track listing 
 "Poker Face"
 "Friend"
 "Poker Face" (KM Marble Life Remix)
 "Poker Face" (Nao'S Attitude Mix)
 "Poker Face" (D-Z Spiritual Delusion Mix)
 "Poker Face" (Orienta-Rhythm Club Mix)
 "Poker Face" (Instrumental)
 "Friend" (Instrumental)

Live performances 
 April 14, 1998 - Nikkan Hitto - Poker Face
 April 20, 1998 - Hey! Hey! Hey! - Poker Face
 April 21, 1998 - Utaban - Poker Face
 April 24, 1998 - Rave - Poker Face
 April 28, 1998 - Music Station - Poker Face

Chart performance

References

External links 
 
 poker face information at Avex Network.
 poker face re-release information at Avex Network.

Ayumi Hamasaki songs
1998 debut singles
2001 singles
Songs written by Ayumi Hamasaki
1998 songs